Michel Jacquemin (born 27 September 1942) is a Belgian racing cyclist. He rode in the 1967 Tour de France.

References

1942 births
Living people
Belgian male cyclists
Place of birth missing (living people)
20th-century Belgian people